Hathurusingha may refer to:
 Chaminda Hathurusingha (born 1971), Sri Lankan cricketer
 Chandika Hathurusingha (born 1968), Sri Lankan cricketer

Sinhalese surnames